Freedom Day is a public holiday in South Africa celebrated on 27 April. It celebrates freedom and commemorates the first post-apartheid elections held on that day in 1994. The elections were the first non-racial national elections where everyone of voting age of over 18 from any race group, including foreign citizens permanently resident in South Africa, were allowed to vote. Previously, under the apartheid regime, non-whites in general had only limited rights to vote while black South Africans had no voting rights whatsoever.

It is part of the twelve public holidays determined by the Public Holidays Act (No. 36 of 1994).

On the first commemoration of the holiday, President Nelson Mandela addressed Parliament:

As a new dawn ushered in this day, the 27th of April 1994, few of us could suppress the welling of emotion, as we were reminded of the terrible past from which we come as a nation; the great possibilities that we now have; and the bright future that beckons us. And so we assemble here today, and in other parts of the country, to mark a historic day in the life of our nation. Wherever South Africans are across the globe, our hearts beat as one, as we renew our common loyalty to our country and our commitment to its future.

See also
 History of South Africa
 South African general election, 1994
 Politics of South Africa
 Freedom Day in other countries
 UnFreedom Day
 Pagan Freedom Day

References

April observances
Society of South Africa
Remembrance days
National days
Observances in South Africa
Autumn events in South Africa
Suffrage
1994 establishments in South Africa